Tikrit Stadium, is a multi-use stadium in Tikrit, Iraq.  It is used mostly for football matches and serves as the home stadium of Salah ad Din FC.  The stadium holds 10,000 people.

References

External links
Venue information

Football venues in Iraq
Tikrit